An election to Highland Regional Council was held on 2 May 1978 as part of the wider 1978 Scottish regional elections. The election saw Independents win control of 37 of the councils 47 seats.

Aggregate results

Ward results

References

Highland
1978
May 1978 events in the United Kingdom